Meskowski was a racing car constructor. Meskowski cars competed in one FIA World Championship race - the 1960 Indianapolis 500.

World Championship Indy 500 results

References

Formula One constructors (Indianapolis only)
American Championship racing cars
American racecar constructors